Patrick Milchraum (born 26 May 1984) is a German former professional footballer who played as a midfielder.

Career
Milchraum was born in Stuttgart.

On 30 May 2005, he scored the first ever official goal at the Allianz Arena football stadium in the opening match against 1. FC Nürnberg. His club TSV 1860 Munich won the match 3–2.

Honours
Dinamo Tbilisi
 Georgian Premier League: 2012–13

References

External links
 
 

1984 births
Living people
German footballers
Association football midfielders
Germany under-21 international footballers
Germany youth international footballers
2. Bundesliga players
3. Liga players
Erovnuli Liga players
Stuttgarter Kickers players
TSV 1860 Munich players
Alemannia Aachen players
FC Erzgebirge Aue players
Karlsruher SC players
FC Zestafoni players
FC Dinamo Tbilisi players
FC Carl Zeiss Jena players
German expatriate footballers
German expatriate sportspeople  in Georgia (country)
Expatriate footballers in Georgia (country)
Footballers from Stuttgart